Yango may refer to,

People
 Jeannette Yango (born 1993), Cameroon footballer
 Abraham Yango (born 1996), Liberian-born Australian footballer
 Guillaume Yango (born 1982), French basketball player
 André Kimbuta Yango (born 1954), Congolese politician
 Yango Simantiri (1940–2007), footballer for both Greece and Israel

Other uses
 Yango language or Monzombo, an Ubangian language of the Congos
 Yango (ride sharing), a ride-hailing, delivery and e-grocery service

See also
 Yango-Asker, Narimanovsky District, Astrakhan Oblast, Russia
 Yangon, Myanmar, formerly known as Rangoon
 Yangos, a Brazilian instrumental quartet